Sharpe's Sword is a 1995 British television drama, the eighth of a series screened on the ITV network that follows the career of Richard Sharpe, a fictional British soldier during the Napoleonic Wars. It is based on the 1983 novel of the same name by Bernard Cornwell, though it is set a year later (1813) than the book.

Plot

On the French-Spanish frontier, a French patrol led by a colonel of Napoleon's Imperial Guard overtakes a carriage containing a priest and three nuns. The priest is the confessor of El Mirador, Wellington's best secret agent; he is tortured into revealing the spy's identity. Then, he and two of the nuns are killed, but the youngest (Emily Mortimer), a novice, gets away.

Major Sharpe (Sean Bean) and his riflemen show up and rout the French, taking a captain captive, while the colonel is killed. Sharpe finds a piece of paper on the prisoner filled with cryptic numbers and suspects that his captive is actually the colonel in disguise. However, he is unable to convince his superior, nor his fellow officer, Captain Jack Spears (James Purefoy); the Frenchman is allowed to give his parole and is not imprisoned. The young woman (referred to simply as "the Lass"), having lost her faith and being rendered mute by the horror she has witnessed, attaches herself to Sharpe.

Back at camp, Wellington's spymaster, Major Mungo Munro (Hugh Ross), has received word that Napoleon himself has sent Colonel Leroux (Patrick Fierry) of the elite Imperial Guard to capture El Mirador. Munro assigns Sharpe the task of killing the colonel, but refuses to divulge the spy's identity. He sends Sharpe and the South Essex Regiment to the town where El Mirador is based.

The British already control the place, but there is a French-held fort close by. When the men near the town, a surprise artillery barrage (rendered extra-surprising by the use of exploding roundshot) from the fort causes enough confusion to allow the prisoner, who is in fact Leroux, to break his parole and escape to its safety.

Sharpe meets two people, his old enemy Sir Henry Simmerson (Michael Cochrane), now the British representative to the town, and Father Curtis, an Irish priest (John Kavanagh), who runs the hospital.

The regiment attacks that night, but the French have been forewarned and the assault is bloodily repulsed. Berkeley is killed at the outbreak of the battle, leaving Sharpe in charge. As Sharpe gains the top of the wall, he is faced by a counterattack led by the escaped French colonel. After a duel, Sharpe is not only physically wounded, but demoralised at the loss of his sword. While he recovers, he sends for British artillery and orders his most literate rifleman, Harris (Jason Salkey), to decode the message he took from Leroux. During this time, the woman regains her voice and her faith as Sharpe convalesces. In addition, Patrick Harper makes a deal with the father and promises to marry Ramona (the proposal that strains Harper as his mother has not got over the grief of the loss of the woman that would form his arranged marriage) in exchange for a new sword for Sharpe. The new sword revitalizes the wounded Sharpe.

Harris succeeds in breaking the code. The message unmasks Spears as a traitor (he had been taken captive, tortured, and then blackmailed by Leroux). However, Spears is unable to bring himself to kill El Mirador, who is revealed to be Father Curtis. When the cannon arrives, Sharpe gives the officer the opportunity for an honourable death.

After the fort is softened up by an artillery barrage, Spears charges singlehanded and plants a British flag at the fort's entrance, rousing the morale of the British soldiers, but is killed shortly after. Sharpe and the South Essex then storm the fort. When Leroux tries to surrender, Sharpe offers him a duel to the death instead; if he kills Sharpe, he can go free. Sharpe wins.

Taking advantage of Sharpe's absence, Simmerson attempts to rape the novice (who had humiliated him earlier when he had made a crude advance), but is stopped by Father Curtis. The priest accuses Simmerson of warning the French of the first attack; when Simmerson advances on him with sword drawn, Father Curtis, an ex-soldier, unexpectedly draws his own and teaches him a very painful lesson.

Differences from the novel

The plot of this episode diverges from the novel in a number of substantial ways, particularly concerning some of the main characters.

 The Marchesa was written out of the episode and instead used, albeit in a completely different role, in Sharpe's Honour. She is Colonel Leroux's sister in the book. Her part in betraying the British is played by Sir Henry Simmerson, who doesn't appear in the novel.
 The character of Jack Spears was made much more sympathetic in the film. In the book, he is a gambler who lost all of his fortune at the table and is corrupted by Leroux, while in the TV movie he succumbs to the French colonel's tortures. He dies as a hero in both the novel and the film, but in the former he is not urged to do so by Sharpe, who discovers the nobleman's betrayal only while he is already dying.
 Some characters, notably "Lass" and Major Munro, were created for the TV movie and do not appear in the novel at all.
 Although Sergeant Harper's love for a Spanish girl is mentioned in the novel, the girl is called Isabella (not Ramona, who is a TV character only) and they do not marry. Harper is wounded both in the movie and in the novel, but in the latter his wound is much worse. Both Sharpe and Harper are wounded while trying to stop Leroux from escaping, as opposed to during the assault to the fort (which is only one in the movie, while there were three forts in the novel).
 In the novel the Battle of Salamanca is the climax of the story.  Richard Sharpe takes part in the famous charge of the KGL cavalry at Garcia Hernandez and breaks French infantry squares.  None of this is shown in the TV film, which ends with the attack on the Salamanca forts.  It is to be assumed the TV film did not show the full battle due to the numbers required and the difficulty of portraying a full cavalry charge on this scale.

Cast
 Sean Bean – Major Richard Sharpe
 Daragh O'Malley – Sergeant Patrick Harper
 John Tams – Rifleman Daniel Hagman
 Jason Salkey – Rifleman Harris
 Emily Mortimer – Lass
 Patrick Fierry – Leroux
 James Purefoy – Spears
 Stephen Moore – Berkeley
 Hugh Ross – Mungo Munro
 Michael Cochrane – Sir Henry Simmerson
 John Kavanagh – Father Curtis
 Vernon Dobtcheff – Don Felipe
 Diana Perez – Ramona
 Pat Laffan – Connelly
 Walter McMonagle – Father O'Sullivan
 Matthew Pannell – Ensign McDonald

External links
 
 Sharpe's Sword at SharpeFilm.com

1995 British television episodes
1990s historical films
1990s war films
Films based on British novels
Films based on historical novels
Films based on military novels
Napoleonic Wars films
Sword
War television films
Fiction set in 1813
Films directed by Tom Clegg (director)